This is a list of organs of the federal government of Brazil that intend to regulate markets:

Brazilian Electricity Regulatory Agency
Administrative Council for Economic Defense
National Health Surveillance Agency
Brazilian Agency of Telecommunications
National Agency of Petroleum, Natural Gas and Biofuels
National Institute of Metrology Standardization and Industrial Quality
Securities and Exchange Commission (Brazil)

Government agencies of Brazil
Brazil politics-related lists
Brazil
Brazil